Encuentro is an album by jazz saxophonist Paul Gonsalves that was released in the U.S. in 1977 by Catalyst Records under the name The Buenos Aires Sessions. Fresh Sound reissued the album under the title Encuentro in 1989.

Track listing
 "Perdido" 
 "I Cover the Waterfront" 
 "Blues for B. A." 
 "St. Louis Blues" 
 "Gone with the Wind/Tenderly/Ramona" 
 "Just Friends" 
 "I Can't Get Started"

Personnel 
 Paul Gonsalves – tenor saxophone 
 Willie Cook – trumpet 
 Enrique Villegas – piano
 Alfredo Remus – bass guitar 
 Eduardo Casalla – drums

References

1968 albums
Paul Gonsalves albums